Rasoul Navidkia (born December 21, 1983) is an Iranian footballer who played for Sepahan  in the Iran Pro League. He is younger brother of Moharram Navidkia, his former teammate at Sepahan.

Club career
In 2010, Navidkia joined Sanat Naft after spending the previous season at Sepahan Novin in the Azadegan League. In 2013, he joined Naft Tehran F.C.

Assists

Honours

Club
Sepahan
Iran Pro League (1): 2014–15

References

Living people
Persian Gulf Pro League players
Azadegan League players
Sanat Mes Kerman F.C. players
Sanat Naft Abadan F.C. players
Sepahan S.C. footballers
Sepahan Novin players
Iranian footballers
1983 births
Association football midfielders